Grzybno  is a village in the administrative district of Gmina Brodnica, within Śrem County, Greater Poland Voivodeship, in west-central Poland.

The village has a population of 300.

History
Grzybno was first mentioned in 1387, also mentioning Tomisław of Grzybno.

From 1874 to 1944, Grzybno was German territory.

From 1975 to 1998, Grzybno administratively belonged to Poznań Voivodeship.

References

Grzybno